George R. Viscome (born 1956) is an American astronomer and a discoverer of minor planets. He also worked as a broadcast technician in Albany, New York.

Viscome has discovered 33 asteroids. Asteroid 6183 Viscome, discovered by Carolyn Shoemaker at the Palomar Observatory in 1987, was named in his honor. The official  was published by the Minor Planet Center on 15 February 1995.

List of discovered minor planets

See also

References 
 

1956 births
American astronomers
Discoverers of minor planets

Living people